Leonard Peltier (born September 12, 1944) is a Native American activist and a member of the American Indian Movement (AIM) who, following a controversial trial, was convicted of two counts of first-degree murder in the deaths of two Federal Bureau of Investigation (FBI) agents in a June 26, 1975, shooting on the Pine Ridge Indian Reservation in South Dakota. He was sentenced to two consecutive terms of life imprisonment and has been imprisoned since 1977 (currently ). Peltier became eligible for parole in 1993. , Peltier is incarcerated at the United States Penitentiary, Coleman in Florida.

In his 1999 memoir Prison Writings: My Life Is My Sun Dance, Peltier admitted to participating in the shootout but said he did not kill the FBI agents. Human rights watchdogs, such as Amnesty International, and political figures including Nelson Mandela, Mother Teresa, and the 14th Dalai Lama, have campaigned for clemency for Peltier. On January 18, 2017, it was announced that President Barack Obama denied Peltier's application for clemency.

At the time of the shootout, Peltier was an active member of the AIM, an Indigenous rights advocacy group that worked to combat the racism and police brutality experienced by American Indians. Peltier ran for president of the United States in 2004, winning the nomination of the Peace and Freedom Party, and receiving 27,607 votes, limited to the ballot in California. He ran for vice president of the United States in 2020 on the Party for Socialism and Liberation ticket with Gloria La Riva as the presidential candidate, as well on tickets for other Left parties and on the ballot of the Peace and Freedom Party. For health reasons, Peltier withdrew from those tickets on August 1, 2020.

He is of Lakota, Dakota, and French descent, and is an enrolled member of the Turtle Mountain Chippewa.

Early life and education
Peltier was born on September 12, 1944, at the Turtle Mountain Indian Reservation of the Turtle Mountain Chippewa near Belcourt, North Dakota, in a family of 13 children. Peltier's parents divorced when he was four years old. Leonard and his sister Betty Ann lived with their paternal grandparents Alex and Mary Dubois-Peltier in the Turtle Mountain Indian Reservation. In September 1953, at the age of nine, Leonard was enrolled at the Wahpeton Indian School in Wahpeton, North Dakota, an Indian boarding school run by the Bureau of Indian Affairs (BIA). He graduated from Wahpeton in May 1957, and attended the Flandreau Indian School in Flandreau, South Dakota. After finishing the ninth grade, he returned to the Turtle Mountain Reservation to live with his father. Peltier later obtained a general equivalency degree (GED).

Career and activism
In 1965, Peltier relocated to Seattle, Washington. Peltier worked as a welder, a construction worker, and as the co-owner of an auto shop in Seattle in his twenties. The co-owners used the upper level of the building as a stopping place, or halfway house, for American Indians who had alcohol addiction issues or had recently finished their prison sentences and were re-entering society. However, the halfway house took a financial toll on the shop, so they closed it.

In Seattle, Peltier became involved in a variety of causes championing Native American civil rights. In the early 1970s, he learned about the factional tensions at the Pine Ridge Indian Reservation in South Dakota between supporters of Richard Wilson, elected tribal chairman in 1972, and traditionalist members of the Lakota tribe. It was Dennis Banks who first invited Leonard Peltier to join AIM. Consequently, Peltier became an official member of the American Indian Movement (AIM) in 1972, which was founded by urban Indians in Minneapolis in 1968, at a time of rising Indian activism for civil rights.

Wilson had created a private militia, known as the Guardians of the Oglala Nation (GOON), whose members were reputed to have attacked political opponents. Protests over a failed impeachment hearing of Wilson contributed to the AIM and Lakota armed takeover of Wounded Knee at the reservation in February 1973. Federal forces reacted, conducting a 71-day siege, which became known as the Wounded Knee incident. They demanded the resignation of Wilson. Peltier, however, spent most of the occupation in a Milwaukee, Wisconsin jail charged with attempted murder related to a different protest. When Peltier secured bail at the end of April, he took part in an AIM protest outside the federal building in Milwaukee and was on his way to Wounded Knee with the group to deliver supplies when the incident ended.

In 1975, Peltier traveled as a member of AIM to the Pine Ridge Indian Reservation to help reduce violence among political opponents. At the time, he was a fugitive, with an arrest warrant having been issued in Milwaukee, Wisconsin. It charged him with unlawful flight to avoid prosecution for the attempted murder of an off-duty Milwaukee police officer. (He was acquitted of the attempted murder charge in February 1978.)

During this period, Peltier had seven children from two marriages and adopted two children.

Shootout at Pine Ridge 

On June 26, 1975, Special Agents Ronald Arthur Williams and Jack Ross Coler of the Federal Bureau of Investigation (FBI) were on the Pine Ridge Indian Reservation searching for a young man named Jimmy Eagle, who was wanted for questioning in connection with the recent assault and robbery of two local ranch hands. Eagle had been involved in a physical altercation with a friend, during which he had stolen a pair of leather cowboy boots. At approximately 11:50 a.m., Williams and Coler, driving two separate unmarked cars, spotted, reported, and followed a red pick-up truck that matched the description of Eagle's.

Soon after his initial report, Williams radioed to a local dispatch that he and Coler had come under fire from the vehicle's occupants. Williams radioed that they would be killed if reinforcements did not arrive. He next radioed that they both had been shot. FBI Special Agent Gary Adams was the first to respond to Williams' call for assistance, and he also came under gunfire; Adams was unable to reach Coler and Williams in time, and both agents died within the first ten minutes of gunfire. At about 4:25 p.m., authorities recovered the bodies of Williams and Coler from their vehicles. Norman Charles fired at the agents with a stolen British .308 rifle. Peltier allegedly had a AR-15 rifle. The two agents had fired a total of five shots: two from Williams' handgun, one round from Coler's handgun, one round from Coler's rifle, and one round from Coler's shotgun.

The FBI reported that Williams had received a defensive wound to his right hand (as he attempted to shield his face) from a bullet that passed through his hand into his head. Williams received two gunshot injuries, to his body and foot, before the contact shot that killed him. Coler, incapacitated from earlier bullet wounds, had been shot twice in the head. In total, 125 bullet holes were found in the agents' vehicles, many from a .223 Remington AR-15 rifle. The shooters allegedly took apart Williams's car and stole four guns belonging to the agents. Allegedly, Darrelle Butler took Williams' handgun, Peltier took Coler's handgun, and Robideau took Coler's two long guns: a .308 rifle and a shotgun. The case against the man the agents had been pursuing (Jimmy Eagle) was dismissed for lack of evidence.

Aftermath 
At least three men were arrested in connection with the shooting: Peltier, Robert Robideau, and Darrelle "Dino" Butler, all AIM members who were present at the Jumping Bull compound at the time of the shootings.

Leonard Peltier provided numerous alibis to several people about his activities on the morning of the attacks. In an interview with the author Peter Matthiessen (In the Spirit of Crazy Horse, 1983), Peltier described working on a car in Oglala, claiming to have driven back to the Jumping Bull Compound about an hour before the shooting started. In an interview with Lee Hill, he described being awakened in the tent city at the ranch by the sound of gunshots. To Harvey Arden, for Prison Writings, he described enjoying a beautiful morning before he heard the firing.

On September 5, 1975, Butler was arrested; Agent Williams's handgun and rounds of ammunition were recovered from an automobile in the vicinity of Butler's arrest location.

On September 9, 1975, Peltier purchased a station wagon. The following day, AIM member Robideau, Norman Charles and Michael Anderson were injured in the accidental explosion of ammunition from Peltier's station wagon on the Kansas Turnpike close to Wichita. Agent Coler's .308 rifle and an AR-15 rifle were found in the burned vehicle. The FBI forwarded a description of a recreational vehicle (RV) and the Plymouth station wagon recently purchased by Peltier to law enforcement during the hunt for the suspects. The RV was stopped by an Oregon State Trooper, but the driver, later discovered to be Peltier, fled on foot following a small shootout. Peltier's thumbprint and Agent Coler's handgun were discovered under the RV's front seat.

Trial 

On December 22, 1975, Peltier was named to the FBI Ten Most Wanted Fugitives list. On February 6, 1976, Peltier was arrested along with Frank Blackhorse, by the Royal Canadian Mounted Police in Hinton, Alberta, Canada at the Smallboy's Reserve/Smallboy Camp, transported to Calgary, Alberta and taken to the Oakalla Prison Farm in Vancouver, British Columbia.

In December 1976, Peltier was extradited from Canada based on documents submitted by the FBI. Warren Allmand, Canada's Solicitor General at the time, later stated that these documents contained false information. (Blackhorse was also extradited to the United States, but charges against him related to the reservation shootout were dropped.) One of the documents relied on in Peltier's extradition was an affidavit signed by Myrtle Poor Bear, a Native American woman local to the area near Pine Ridge Reservation. While Poor Bear stated that she was Peltier's girlfriend during that time and watched the killings, Peltier and others at the scene said that Poor Bear did not know Peltier and was not present during the murders. Poor Bear later admitted to lying to the FBI, but said that the agents interviewing her had coerced her into making the claims. When Poor Bear tried to testify against the FBI, the judge barred her testimony because of mental incompetence.

Peltier fought extradition to the United States. Robideau and Butler were acquitted on grounds of self-defense by a federal jury in Cedar Rapids, Iowa. Peltier returned too late to be tried with Robideau and Butler, and he was subsequently tried separately.

Peltier's trial was held in Fargo, North Dakota, where a jury convicted him of the murders of Coler and Williams. Unlike the testimony in the trial for Butler and Robideau, the jury was informed that the two FBI agents were killed by close-range shots to their heads, when they were already defenseless due to previous gunshot wounds. Consequently, Peltier could not submit a self-defense testimony that may have resulted in an acquittal. The jury was also shown autopsy and crime scene photographs of the two agents, which had not been shown to the jury at Cedar Rapids. In April 1977, Peltier was convicted and sentenced to two consecutive life sentences.

Inconsistencies in the prosecution's case 
Numerous doubts have been raised over Peltier's guilt and the fairness of his trial, based on allegations and inconsistencies in the FBI and prosecution's handling of the case. Several key witnesses in the initial trial have recanted their statements and stated they were made under duress at the hands of the FBI. At least one witness was given immunity from prosecution in exchange for testimony against Peltier.

Recanted witness statements 
Peltier was convicted in 1977 largely on the evidence presented by three witness affidavits, all signed by Myrtle Poor Bear, that placed him at the scene of the shootout and contended that Peltier planned his crimes. Poor Bear claimed to be Peltier's girlfriend at the time, but later admitted that she never knew him personally. Moreover, Poor Bear was known to be mentally unstable. This was  confirmed when the FBI deemed her unfit to testify in court. But her testimony, as put forth in her previous affidavits, remained a key part of the prosecution's case against Peltier. Two other witnesses whose testimony was used to place Peltier at the scene of the crime also later recanted. They alleged that the FBI had coerced and threatened them by tying them to chairs, denying them their right to talk to their attorney, and otherwise intimidating them.

Discrepancies in material evidence 
FBI radio intercepts indicated that the two FBI agents Williams and Coler had entered the Pine Ridge Reservation in pursuit of a suspected thief in a red pickup truck. The FBI confirmed this claim the day after the shootout, but red pickup trucks near the reservation had been stopped for weeks, and Leonard Peltier did not drive a red pickup truck. Evidence was given that Peltier was driving a Chevrolet Suburban; a large sport utility vehicle-style vehicle built on a pickup truck chassis, with an enclosed rear section. Peltier's vehicle was orange with a white roof—not a red, open-bed pickup truck with no white paint.

At Peltier's trial, the FBI changed their previous statements that they had been in search of a red pickup truck and instead said that they were looking for an orange and white van, similar to the one Peltier drove. This contradictory statement by the FBI was a highly contentious matter of evidence in the trials.

Though the FBI's investigation indicated that an AR-15 was used to kill the agents, several different AR-15s were in the area at the time of the shootout. Also, no other cartridge cases or evidence about them were offered by the prosecutor's office, although other bullets were fired at the crime scene. During the trial, all the bullets and bullet fragments found at the scene were provided as evidence and detailed by Cortland Cunningham, FBI Firearms expert, in testimony (Ref US v. Leonard Peltier, Vol 9). Years later, a request under the Freedom of Information Act prompted another examination of the FBI ballistics report used to convict Peltier. An impartial expert evaluated the firing pin linked to the gun that shot Williams and Coler and concluded that the cartridge case from the scene of the crime did not come from the rifle tied to Peltier. This evidence negated a key facet of the prosecution's case against Peltier. The court did not allow the defense to present the Fargo jury with information about other cases in which the FBI had been rebuked for tampering with evidence and witnesses. In some similar prosecutions against AIM leaders at the time, defense attorneys did present such evidence to the juries.

1979 prison escape 
Peltier began serving his sentences in 1977. On July 20, 1979, he and two other inmates escaped from Federal Correctional Institution, Lompoc. Peltier remained at large until he was captured by a search party three days later near Santa Maria, California, after a farmer alerted authorities that Peltier, armed with a Ruger Mini-14 rifle, had consumed some of his crops and stolen his shoes, wallet, and pickup truck key. Peltier attempted to drive the truck away at high speeds down the rough gravel road, resulting in a broken transmission, after which he again fled on foot. Peltier was later apprehended without incident. After a six-week trial held in Los Angeles before Judge Lawrence T. Lydick, Peltier was convicted and sentenced to serve a five-year sentence for escape and a two-year sentence for being a felon in possession of a firearm, in addition to his preexisting two life sentences.

Clemency appeals

Support for clemency 
Peltier's conviction sparked great controversy and has drawn criticism from a number of prominent figures across a wide range of disciplines. In 1999, Peltier asserted on CNN that he did not commit the murders and that he has no knowledge who shot the FBI agents nor knowledge implicating others in the crime. Peltier has described himself as a political prisoner. Numerous public and legal appeals have been filed on his behalf; however, due to the consistent objection of the FBI, none of the resulting rulings has been made in his favor. His appeals for clemency received support from world famous civil rights advocates including Nelson Mandela, Archbishop Desmond Tutu, and Rev. Jesse Jackson, Tenzin Gyatso (the 14th Dalai Lama), Nobel Peace Prize Laureate and activist Rigoberta Menchú, and Mother Teresa. International government entities such as the Office of the United Nations High Commissioner on Human Rights, the United Nations Working Group on Indigenous Populations, the European Parliament, the Belgian Parliament, and the Italian Parliament have all passed resolutions in favor of Peltier's clemency. Moreover, several human rights groups including The International Federation of Human Rights and Amnesty International have launched campaigns advocating for Peltier's clemency. In the United States, the Kennedy Memorial Center for Human Rights, the Committee of Concerned Scientists, Inc., the National Lawyers Guild, and the American Association of Jurists are all active supporters of clemency for Peltier.

The police officer that arrested Peltier is convinced that he "was extradited illegally and that he didn't get a fair trial in the United States."

On June 7, 2022, The United Nations Human Rights Council's Working Group on Arbitrary Detention released a seventeen-page analysis of Peltier's detention, rendering the opinion that it contravenes "articles 2, 7, and 9 of the Universal Declaration of Human Rights and articles 2 (1), 9 and 26 of the
International Covenant on Civil and Political Rights, is arbitrary and falls within
categories III and V." The Working Group urged a "full and independent investigation" surrounding his detention and requested that the US government remedy his situation "without delay and bring it into conformity with the relevant international norms."

Denial of clemency 
In 1999, Peltier filed a habeas corpus petition, but it was rejected by the 10th Circuit Court on November 4, 2003. Near the end of the Clinton administration in 2001, rumors began circulating that Bill Clinton was considering granting Peltier clemency. Opponents of Peltier campaigned against his possible clemency; about 500 FBI agents and families protested outside the White House, and FBI director Louis Freeh sent a letter opposing Peltier's clemency to the White House. Clinton did not grant Peltier clemency. In 2002, Peltier filed a civil rights lawsuit in the U.S. District Court for the District of Columbia against the FBI, Louis Freeh and FBI agents who had participated in the campaign against his clemency petition, alleging that they "engaged in a systematic and officially sanctioned campaign of misinformation and disinformation." On March 22, 2004, the suit was dismissed. In January 2009, President George W. Bush denied Peltier's clemency petition before leaving office.

In 2016, Peltier's attorney's filed a clemency application with the White House's Office of the Pardon Attorney, and his supporters organized a campaign to convince President Barack Obama to commute Peltier's sentence, a campaign which included an appeal by Pope Francis, as well as James Reynolds, a senior attorney and former US Attorney who supervised the prosecution against Peltier in the appeal period following his initial trial. In a letter to the United States Department of Justice, Reynolds wrote that clemency was "in the best interest of justice in considering the totality of all matters involved". In a subsequent letter to the Chicago Tribune, Reynolds added that the case against Peltier "was a very thin case that likely would not be upheld by courts today. It is a gross overstatement to label Peltier a 'cold-blooded murderer' on the basis of the minimal proof that survived the appeals in his case." On January 18, 2017, two days before President Obama left office, the Office of the Pardon Attorney announced that Obama had denied Peltier's application for clemency. On June 8, 2018, KFGO Radio in Fargo, N.D., reported that Peltier filed a formal clemency request with President Trump. KFGO obtained and published a letter that was sent by Peltier's attorney to the White House. On 6 February 2023, Leonard Peltier again made a plea for clemency.

Remaining questions 
In the documentary film Incident at Oglala (1992), AIM activist Robert Robideau said that the FBI agents had been shot by a 'Mr X'. When Peltier was interviewed about 'Mr X', he said he knew who the man was. Dino Butler, in a 1995 interview with E.K. Caldwell of News From Indian Country, said that 'Mr X' was a creation of Peltier's supporters and had been named as the murderer in an attempt to gain Peltier's release from prison. In a 2001 interview with News From Indian Country, Bernie Lafferty said that she had witnessed Peltier's referring to his murder of one of the agents.

Later developments

2002 editorial about deaths of agents and Aquash 
In January 2002 in the News from Indian Country, publisher Paul DeMain wrote an editorial that an "unnamed delegation" told him that Peltier had murdered the FBI agents. DeMain described the delegation as "grandfathers and grandmothers, AIM activists, pipe carriers and others who have carried a heavy unhealthy burden within them that has taken its toll." DeMain said he was also told that the motive for the execution-style murder of high-ranking AIM activist Anna Mae Aquash in December 1975 at Pine Ridge "allegedly was her knowledge that Leonard Peltier had shot the two agents, as he was convicted."

DeMain did not accuse Peltier of participation in the Aquash murder. In 2003 two Native American men were indicted and later convicted of the murder.

On May 1, 2003, Peltier sued DeMain for libel for similar statements about the case published on March 10, 2003, in News from Indian Country. On May 25, 2004, Peltier withdrew the suit after he and DeMain settled the case. DeMain issued a statement saying he did not think Peltier was given a fair trial for the two murder convictions, nor did he think Peltier was connected to Aquash's death. DeMain stated he did not retract his allegations that Peltier was guilty of the murders of the FBI agents and that the motive for Aquash's murder was the fear that she might inform on the activist.

Indictments and trials for the murder of Aquash
In 2003 there were federal grand jury hearings on charges against Arlo Looking Cloud and John Graham for the murder of Anna Mae Aquash. Bruce Ellison, Leonard Peltier's lawyer since the 1970s, was subpoenaed and invoked his Fifth Amendment rights against self-incrimination, refusing to testify. He also refused to testify, on the same grounds, at Looking Cloud's trial in 2004. During the trial, the federal prosecutor named Ellison as a co-conspirator in the Aquash case. Witnesses said that Ellison participated in interrogating Aquash about being an FBI informant on December 11, 1975, shortly before her murder.

In February 2004, Fritz Arlo Looking Cloud, an Oglala Sioux, was tried and convicted of the murder of Aquash. In Looking Cloud's trial, the prosecution argued that AIM's suspicion of Aquash stemmed from her having heard Peltier admit to the murders of the FBI agents. Darlene "Kamook" Nichols, former wife of the AIM leader Dennis Banks, testified that in late 1975, Peltier told of shooting the FBI agents. He was talking to a small group of AIM activists who were fugitives from law enforcement. They included Nichols, her sister Bernie Nichols (later Lafferty), Nichols' husband Dennis Banks, and Aquash, among several others. Nichols testified that Peltier said, "The motherfucker was begging for his life, but I shot him anyway." Bernie Nichols-Lafferty gave the same account of Peltier's statement. At the time, all were fleeing law enforcement after the Pine Ridge shootout.

Earlier in 1975, AIM member Douglass Durham had been revealed to be an undercover FBI agent and dismissed from the organization. AIM leaders were fearful of infiltration. Other witnesses have testified that, when Aquash was suspected of being an informant, Peltier interrogated her while holding a gun to her head. Peltier and David Hill were said to have Aquash participate in bomb-making so that her fingerprints would be on the bombs. Prosecutors alleged in court documents that the trio planted these bombs at two power plants on the Pine Ridge Indian Reservation on Columbus Day 1975.

During the trial, Nichols acknowledged receiving $42,000 from the FBI in connection with her cooperation on the case. She said it was compensation for travel expenses to collect evidence and moving expenses to be farther from her ex-husband Dennis Banks, whom she feared because she had implicated him as a witness. Peltier has claimed that Kamook Nichols committed perjury with her testimony.

No investigation has been opened into the allegedly perjured testimony of Kamook Nichols (as there exists no evidence of her committing perjury whatsoever, just Peltier and his supporter's ad hominem accusations of perjury), now married to a former FBI Chief Agent and living under the name Darlene Ecoffey. During the Looking Cloud trial, the Honorable Lawrence L. Piersol admitted the testimony with the following statement: "The requested testimony is hearsay, but I am going to admit it for a limited purpose only. This is a limiting instruction. It isn't admitted nor received for the truth of the matter stated. In other words, whether the rumor is true or not. It is simply received as to what the rumor was. So it is limited to what the rumor was, it is not admitted for the truth of the statement as to whether the rumor was true or not." What relevance this has to the perjury accusations is opaque at the very best.

On June 26, 2007, the Supreme Court of British Columbia ordered the extradition of John Graham to the United States to stand trial for his alleged role in the murder of Aquash. He was eventually tried by the state of South Dakota in 2010. During Graham's trial, Darlene "Kamook" Ecoffey said Peltier told both her and Aquash that he had killed the FBI agents in 1975. Ecoffey testified under oath, "He (Peltier) held his hand like this", she said, pointing her index finger like a gun, "and he said 'that (expletive) was begging for his life but I shot him anyway.'" Graham was convicted of murdering Aquash and sentenced to life in prison.

Presidential politics
Peltier was the candidate for the Peace and Freedom Party in the 2004 election for President of the United States. While numerous states have laws that prohibit prison inmates convicted of felonies from voting (Maine and Vermont are exceptions), the United States Constitution has no prohibition against felons being elected to federal offices, including President. The Peace and Freedom Party secured ballot status for Peltier only in California. His presidential candidacy received 27,607 votes, approximately 0.2% of the vote in that state.

In 2020 he ran as the vice-presidential running mate of Gloria La Riva, on the ticket of the Party for Socialism and Liberation in the presidential campaign. He was forced to resign from the ticket for health reasons in early August 2020, and was replaced with Sunil Freeman.

Ruling on FBI documents
In a February 27, 2006, decision, U.S. District Judge William Skretny ruled that the FBI did not have to release five of 812 documents relating to Peltier and held at their Buffalo field office. He ruled that the particular documents were exempted on the grounds of "national security and FBI agent/informant protection". In his opinion, Judge Skretny wrote, "Plaintiff has not established the existence of bad faith or provided any evidence contradicting (the FBI's) claim that the release of these documents would endanger national security or would impair this country's relationship with a foreign government." In response, Michael Kuzma, a member of Peltier's defense team, said, "We're appealing. It's incredible that it took him 254 days to render a decision." Kuzma further said, "The pages we were most intrigued about revolved around a teletype from Buffalo ... a three-page document that seems to indicate that a confidential source was being advised by the FBI not to engage in conduct that would compromise attorney-client privilege."
Peltier's supporters have tried to obtain more than 100,000 pages of documents from FBI field offices, claiming that the files should have been turned over at the time of his trial or following a Freedom of Information Act (FOIA) request filed soon after.

Victim of prison violence
On January 13, 2009, Peltier was beaten by inmates at the United States Penitentiary, Canaan, where he had been transferred from USP Lewisburg. He was sent back to Lewisburg, where he remained until the fall of 2011, when he was transferred to a federal penitentiary in Florida. As of 2016, Leonard Peltier is housed at Coleman Federal Correctional Complex in Coleman, Florida.

In popular culture

Books

Sculpture
In 2016, a statue of Peltier, based on a self portrait he made in prison, was created by artist Rigo 23 and installed on the grounds of American University in Washington, D.C.. After the university received complaints from the FBI Agents Association, the statue was removed and relocated to the Main Museum in Los Angeles.

Films
 Incident at Oglala: The Leonard Peltier Story (1992) is a documentary by Michael Apted about Peltier and narrated by Robert Redford. The film argues in favour of the assertion that the government's prosecution of Peltier was unjust and politically motivated.
 Thunderheart (1992) is a fictional movie by Michael Apted, partly based on Peltier's case but with no pretense to accuracy.
 Warrior, The Life of Leonard Peltier (1992) is a feature documentary film about Peltier's life, the American Indian Movement, and his trial directed by Suzie Baer. The film argues that the government's prosecution of Peltier was unjust and motivated by the hugely profitable energy interests in the area.

Music
 Free Salamander Exhibit released the song "Undestroyed" on December 13, 2016. The lyrics are drawn nearly verbatim from Peltier's book, Prison Writings: My Life Is My Sun Dance.
 Little Steven released the song "Leonard Peltier" on his 1989 album Revolution. The song discusses Peltier's case and the struggle of the Native Americans.
 The Indigo Girls popularized Buffy St. Marie's song, "Bury My Heart at Wounded Knee", with a cover on their 1995 live album 1200 Curfews. The song mentions Peltier, saying, "the bullets don’t match the gun."
 Sixteen Canadian artists contributed to Pine Ridge: An Open Letter to Allan Rock – Songs for Leonard Peltier, a benefit CD released in 1996 by What Magazine.
 Toad the Wet Sprocket reference Peltier, as well as the conflict at Pine Ridge and the Wounded Knee massacre, in their song "Crazy Life" on their album Coil (1997)
 Anal Cunt released the song "Laughing While Lennard Peltier Gets Raped In Prison" as a part of their album It Just Gets Worse.
 U2 recorded the song "Native Son" about Peltier. It was later reworked into their hit song "Vertigo" on their album, How to Dismantle an Atomic Bomb (2004). Five years later, "Native Son" was released on their digital album Unreleased and Rare (2009).
 Bring Leonard Peltier Home in 2012 was a concert that took place at the Beacon Theatre in New York City. The concert featured Pete Seeger, Harry Belafonte, Jackson Browne, Common, Mos Def, Michael Moore, Danny Glover, Rubin "Hurricane" Carter, Bruce Cockburn, Margo Thunderbird, Silent Bear, Bill Miller, etc. all standing up for the immediate release of Leonard Peltier.
 Rage Against The Machine's 1994 "Freedom" video clip shows footage of the case and ends with a picture of Peltier in prison and the phrase "justice has not been done".
 "Sacrifice" from Contact from the Underworld of Redboy, the 1998 music recording by Robbie Robertson (formerly of The Band), features voice recordings of Peltier throughout the song, and surrounded with melody and vocals. The song ends with Peltier alone sayin, "I've gone too far now to start backing down. I don't give up. Not 'til my people are free will I give up and if I have to sacrifice some more, then I sacrifice some more."
 French singer Renaud released a song called "Leonard's Song" in his 2006 album Rouge Sang. It supports Peltier and Native American rights, comparing in its lyrics the foundation of America to conducting an equivalent of The Holocaust against the Native American people.
 Alternative hip-hop trio The Goats mention Peltier several times on their 1992 debut album Tricks of the Shade: in a track entitled "Leonard Peltier in a Cage", and in the song "Do the Digs Dug" (which also mentions activist Annie Mae Aquash – lyrics referencing them are "Leonard Peltier Leonard Peltier Who da hell is that, why the f*** should ya care? In jail, in jail, in jail like a dealer F*** George Bush says my T-Shirt squeeler Please oh please set Leonard P. free Cause ya wiped out his race like an ant colony Whatcha afraid of, Annie Mae Aquash? Found her lying in the ditch with no place for a watch")

Other
 It was reported by Joseph Corré that the last words of his father, Malcolm McLaren (1946–2010), were "Free Leonard Peltier".

Publications
 Arden, Harvey (& Leonard Peltier). "Have You Thought of Leonard Peltier Lately?" HYT Publishing, 2004. .
 Peltier, Leonard. Prison Writings: My Life Is My Sun Dance. New York, 1999. .

See also 
 List of memoirs of political prisoners
 List of longest prison sentences served
 Category:Native American activists
 Lapu Lapu
 Omar Mukhtar
 Chino Roces

Endnotes

References

Further reading 
 "Writer Sues Peltier", Kansas City Star, July 3, 1992.
 Anderson, Scott. "The Martyrdom of Leonard Peltier", Outside Magazine, July 1995.
 Churchill, Ward and Jim Vander Wall: Agents of Repression: The FBI's Secret Wars Against the Black Panther Party and the American Indian Movement. South End Press, Cambridge, Massachusetts, 1988, 2002. .
 Churchill, Ward and Jim Vander Wall: The COINTELPRO Papers: Documents from the FBI's Secret Wars Against Dissent in the United States. South End Press, Cambridge, Massachusetts, 1990, 2002. .
 Matthiessen, Peter (1983). In the Spirit of Crazy Horse. Penguin. .
 Messerschmidt, Jim or also known as James W. Messerschmidt. The Trial of Leonard Peltier. South End Press, Boston, Massachusetts, 1983. .

External links

 
 Native American Activist Leonard Peltier's Jailhouse Plea for Long-Denied Clemency, an interview with Peter Coyote on Democracy Now!, December 13, 2012
 The Leonard Peltier Trial (Documents)
 Interview with Leonard Peltier from jail in 2000 by Democracy Now!
 Federal Bureau of Investigation, Minneapolis Division: Leonard Peltier Case
 Leonard Peltier Memorial Bridge
 Leonard Peltier on Earth Liberation Prisoners Support Network
 No Parole Peltier Association
 International Leonard Peltier Defense Committee (archived)
 A.I.M (the American Indian Movement)
 Parole Hearing to Be Held Tuesday for Imprisoned Native American Activist Leonard Peltier – video report by Democracy Now! July 27, 2009
 the yet official Leonard Peltier ~ Defense Offense Committee – LP-DOC(since May 2008)

1944 births
1975 murders in the United States
2020 United States vice-presidential candidates
20th-century Native Americans
21st-century Native Americans
Dakota people
Lakota people
Ojibwe people
Living people
Members of the American Indian Movement
Native American activists
Native American artists
Native American writers
Native American candidates for Vice President of the United States
American people of French descent
American escapees
20th-century American memoirists
Escapees from United States federal government detention
FBI Ten Most Wanted Fugitives
People extradited from Canada to the United States
People convicted of murder by the United States federal government
People convicted of murdering FBI agents
Prisoners sentenced to life imprisonment by the United States federal government
Political prisoners
Political prisoners in the United States
American people convicted of murdering police officers
American prisoners sentenced to life imprisonment
Peace and Freedom Party presidential nominees
Candidates in the 2004 United States presidential election
People from Grand Forks, North Dakota